北斗 is an East Asian name meaning "Northern dipper" or "Big Dipper".

北斗 may refer to:
 Beidou (disambiguation), the Chinese transliteration
 Hokuto (disambiguation), the Japanese transliteration